Aron Vergelis (Yiddish: אהרן װערגעליס; Russian: Аро́н А́лтерович Верге́лис; 7 May 1918, in Liubar (now in Zhitomyr Oblast) – 7 April 1999, in Moscow) was a Soviet poet and Jewish journalist who wrote in Yiddish.

Vergelis attended high school in Birobidzhan, Soviet Union, where his parents had moved in 1932 (Jewish Autonomous Oblast). He published his first works in 1935 and his first collection of poems in 1940, the same year he graduated from the Lenin Moscow Pedagogical Institute. He took part in World War II, worked as an editor of Yiddish-language radio broadcasts and after the war as secretary of the Jewish department of the Union of Soviet Writers.

He was one of the few Jewish writers who managed to avoid the purges of 1948–1953. In 1955, he became a member of the CPSU. From 1961 on, he served as editor-in-chief of the Yiddish-language journal Sovetish Heymland (Soviet Homeland) while participating in Soviet anti-Zionist campaigns.

References

1918 births
1999 deaths
20th-century Russian male writers
20th-century Russian poets
Communist Party of the Soviet Union members
Moscow State Pedagogical University alumni
Recipients of the Order of Friendship of Peoples
Recipients of the Order of the Red Banner of Labour
Jewish anti-Zionism in the Soviet Union
Anti-Zionist Jews
Jewish poets
Jewish socialists
Jewish writers
Russian communists
Russian Jews
Russian male poets
Russian male writers
Socialist realism writers
Soviet Jews
Soviet male poets
Translators to Yiddish
Yiddish-language journalists
Yiddish-language poets